T Train may refer to any of the following:

T (New York City Subway service), a service designation of the New York City Subway
T Third Street, a Muni Metro light rail line in San Francisco
T Line (Sound Transit), a streetcar in Tacoma, Washington
Massachusetts Bay Transportation Authority, operator of railway systems in Massachusetts popularly referred to as "The T"
Pittsburgh Light Rail, also known as "The T"